Charles Thompson (Utselata, or Oochelata also ᎤᏤᎴᏛ in Cherokee) was born to a full-blood Cherokee father and a European-American mother in the Southeastern United States. According to one writer, the mother had been kidnapped at a young age and raised by Cherokees. She never learned the identities of her real parents nor when or where she was born. As a result, she did not speak English and could communicate only in Cherokee. The family migrated west to Indian Territory during the Trail of Tears, and settled near the present-day site of Lake Spavinaw, in what is now Delaware County, Oklahoma.

Education
Utselata, as he was called until later in life, attended the Baptist Mission School, where he was strongly influenced by the Reverend Evan Jones and John B. Jones. He joined the Baptist church during this time. Utselata joined the Keetoowah Society in 1859, when it was founded by John B. Jones. The abolition of slavery was one of the society's principles.

Civil War military service
He enlisted in Drew's 1st Cherokee Mounted Rifles, a Confederate unit commanded by Colonel John Drew. He rescinded his enlistment and joined the Third Indian Home Guards as a corporal on July 11, 1862. This unit, commanded by Lieutenant Colonel Lewis Downing, served with the Union Army. Utselata continued to serve through the rest of the war.

Post-war life
At the end of the Civil War, Utselata moved to a place on Spavinaw Creek, near the present-day town of Eucha, Oklahoma, where he established a farm. He occasionally practiced law before the tribal courts.

In 1867 he was elected to the Senate of the Cherokee Nation, where he represented the Delaware District until 1873. and served as Principal Chief of the Cherokee Nation from 1875 to 1879. During this time, he took the Anglicized name Charles Thompson. The surname honored Dr. Jeter Lynch Thompson, his predecessor in the Senate. He used that name from then until his death.

He was a Baptist deacon, preaching each Sunday at the church in Eucha in the Cherokee language. The church denied him ordination as a minister because of a policy that prevented lawyers from becoming ordained ministers. This alleged disqualification was waived when he became principal chief.

Death and burials
Charles Thompson died June 22, 1891, and was buried in the Indian cemetery at Eucha. The town of Eucha, including the cemetery, was relocated before Lake Eucha was completed in 1952. He was reburied just inside the new cemetery. A military stone at the grave honors his service to the Union during the Civil War.

Sources
McLoughlin, William G. After the Trail of Tears: The Cherokees' Struggle for Sovereignty 1839-1880. 1993. University of North Carolina Press. Chapel Hill.

References

Year of birth missing
1891 deaths
Baptists from Oklahoma
Cherokee Confederates
People of Indian Territory
Pre-statehood history of Oklahoma
Principal Chiefs of the Cherokee Nation (1794–1907)